Ragheb Harb (1952–1984 was a Lebanese leader and Muslim cleric. He was born in Jibchit in 1952, a village in the Jabal Amel region of Southern Lebanon. Harb was an imam and led the regional Shiite resistance against Israeli occupation. In March 1983 he was detained by the Israel Defense Forces, but following wide spread demonstrations throughout southern Lebanon he was released seventeen days later. On 16 February 1984 he was assassinated by Lebanese collaborators working for Shin Bet. Hussein Abbas, one of the assassins, fled to America where he lived in the home of his uncle, the academic Professor Fouad Ajami. Danny Abdallah, a Lebanese criminal living in Denmark, admitted to having killed Harb on behalf of the Israelis, and also claimed to have participated in the kidnapping of Harb's successor, Abdul Karim Obeyd. As a result, Hezbollah put him on their death list, and he is wanted in Lebanon. According to one source, Harb's supporters would go on to form the Lebanese paramilitary and political organization Hezbollah. He belonged to the first Shiite party in Lebanon, the "Amal Movement".

See also 
 Amal movement
 Hezbollah
 Abdul Karim Obeyd
 List of assassinated Lebanese people

References

1952 births
1984 deaths
Assassinated Lebanese politicians
People killed in Mossad operations
Amal Movement politicians
20th-century Lebanese politicians